Sword and Fist: A Guidebook to Fighters and Monks is an optional rulebook for the 3rd edition of Dungeons & Dragons, written by Jason Carl and published in trade paperback format.

Contents
The guidebook provides supplemental information for characters belonging to the Fighter and Monk base classes. This book contained tips for creating and playing characters of the aforementioned class, as well as a large number of prestige classes, most of which have been reintroduced in the 3.5 supplemental sourcebook Complete Warrior.

Chapter 1 - Feats and Skills
This chapter gives descriptions of 31 new martial-related feats (such as Circle Kick and Rapid Reload) and 6 new knowledge-based skills (such as Literature and Mathematics). Several standard skills are also clarified to include new uses.

Chapter 2 - Prestige Classes
This chapter gives descriptions and advancement information for the following prestige classes:
 Cavalier
 Devoted Defender
 Drunken Master
 Duelist
 Fist of Hextor
 Ghostwalker
 Gladiator
 Halfling Outrider
 Knight Protector of the Great Kingdom
 Lasher
 Master of Chains
 Master Samurai
 Ninja of the Crescent Moon
 Order of the Bow Initiate
 Ravager
 Red Avenger
 Tribal Protector
 Warmaster
 Weapon Master

Chapter 3 - Worldly Matters
This chapter discusses means of smoothly incorporating Fighters and Monks into the world around them. It also contains histories for several martial organizations that can be added to a campaign setting.

Chapter 4 - The Game within the Game
This chapter contains tips on playing a martial class or prestige class and possible strategies and tactics to succeed in a campaign. Rules for monstrous Fighters and Monks are also given in this chapter, including rules for dealing with multiple limbs, flight, and other non-humanoid physical traits.

Chapter 5 - Tools of the Trade
This chapter introduces new exotic weapons, magic items, and vehicles. Towers, keeps, and castles for martial characters are also discussed, including the Elven Canopy Tower and the Dwarven Plateau Castle.

Publication history
Sword and Fist was designed by Jason Carl. David Noonan contributed some prestige classes to the book. The book was published in 2001 by Wizards of the Coast. Cover art was by Jeff Easley, with interior art by Dennis Cramer.

Reception
The reviewer from Pyramid stated that "The Complete Fighter's Handbook [...] set the stage for kits, and was the prototype for the entire Complete series. History repeats itself as the first class support book for third edition, Sword and Fist, focuses on Fighters and Monks."

See also
 Defenders of the Faith
 Masters of the Wild
 Song and Silence
 Tome and Blood

References

External links
 Product page at Wizards.com

Handbooks and manuals